Morid may refer to:
 Ahmad Morid (born 1956), Afghan singer now living in Germany and performing internationally
 Moridae, a family of fish